Urvič may refer to:
 Urvič, Bogovinje, North Macedonia
 Urvič (Vladičin Han), Serbia